Haiyan may refer to:

Places
Haiyan, Guangdong, a town in Guangdong
Haiyan County, Qinghai, a county of Haibei Tibetan Autonomous Prefecture, Qinghai
Haiyan County, Zhejiang, a county of Jiaxing, Zhejiang

People with the given name
Haiyan (a feminine given name of Chinese origin:
Qian Haiyan (1955–2013), Chinese female United Nations Civil Servant
Xu Haiyan (born 1984), Chinese female free style wrestler
Ye Haiyan (born 1975), female Chinese human rights activist
Zhou Haiyan (born 1990), Chinese female middle-distance runner

Other masculine given names with the same pronunciation but different Chinese characters: 
Hu Haiyan (born 1956), male Chinese academic and president of Beijing Institute of Technology
Ma Haiyan (1837–1900), Chinese male Muslim General of the Qing Dynasty

Other uses
Typhoon Haiyan (disambiguation), the name of several tropical storms in the Pacific Ocean
 Typhoon Haiyan, an extremely powerful 2013 tropical cyclone in the Philippines